Mohammad Reza Eslami (born 1945) is an Iranian scientist and professor of Mechanical Engineering at Tehran Polytechnic (Amirkabir University of Technology), Tehran, Iran.

Education
 Ph.D. – Louisiana State University, Baton Rouge La., US,  1973
 M.Sc.  – Louisiana State University, Baton Rouge La., US, 1970
 B.Sc.  – Amirkabir University of Technology (Tehran Polytechnic), Tehran, Iran 1968

Recognition and awards
 ASME Fellow, 2001.
 AIAA Associate Fellow, 1996.
 Fellow Iran Academy of Science, head of mechanical engineering branch (1992–95), Chairman of Engineering section (2003-2005, 2019,....)
 National Secretary of the ISME Honor members committee.
 Distinguished Professor ; Amirkabir University of Technology 1991, and 1997,2002
 ASME 1994 Award Plaque, American Society of Mech. Eng.(ASME), ASME-ESDA Conf. London, July 1994
 ISME 1996 Plaque recipient, National distinguished Professor
 ASME 1996 Award plaque ASME-ESDA conf. Montpellier, France, July 1996
 1998 ESDA Award PLaque, Society for Design and Process Science, Third World Conference on Integrated Design and Process Tech.,1998, Berlin, Germany.
 ASME Award PLaque, American Society of MechanicalEngineers, Petroleum Div., ESDA 2000 Conference, Montreux, Switzerland, July 10–13, 2000.
 ASME Petroleum Div. Medal, American Society of Mechanical Engineers, Petroleum Div., ESDA 2000 Conference, Montreux, Switzerland, July 10–13, 2000.
 Nationally distinguished researcher, Ministry of Higher Education, Iran, 2002.
 Nationally distinguished Professor, Ministry of Higher Education, Iran, 2003.

Books
 Editor: " Design: Analysis, Synthesis, and Application, Vol. C " Pub. ASME, New York, 1994 
 Co-Editor: " Design: Analysis, Synthesis, and Application, Vol. A" Pub. ASME, New York, 1994
 Co-Editor: " Design: Analysis, Synthesis, and Application, Vol. B" Pub. ASME, New York, 1994
 Editor: " Computational and Thermomechanic, Proc. ASME-ESDA conf. ASME, New York, 1996
 Co-Editor: " General Design Analysis, Considerations and Applications — Education., Vol. 6, SDPS, Texas, 1998.
 Hetnarski, R.B, and Eslami, M.R., Thermal Stresses, Advanced Theory and Applications, Springer, Netherlands, 2009.
 Hetnarski, R.B, and Eslami, M.R., Thermal Stresses, Advanced Theory and Applications, Second Edition, Springer, Switzerland, 2019.
 Eslami, M.R., Hetnarski, R.B., Ignaczak, J., Noda, N., Sumi, N., Tanigawa, Y., {\bf Theory of Elasticity and Thermal Stresses, Problems and Solutions}, Springer, The Netherlands, 2013. 
 Author: A First Course in Finite Element Analysis, (in English), Amirkabir University Press,2003
 Author: " Finite Elements Methods in Mechanics", Springer, Switzerland, 2014.
 Author: " Buckling and Postbuckling of Beams, Plates, and Shells", Springer, Switzerland, 2018.
 Book Section - Thermal Stresses in Thick FGM Pressure Vessels, Appeared in "Pressure Vessels and Piping : Codes, Standards, Design and Analysis", Edited by  Baldev Raj, B.K. Choudhary, and Velusamy, Narosa Publishing House, 2007, India.

References

1945 births
Living people
Iranian mechanical engineers
Louisiana State University alumni
Iranian Science and Culture Hall of Fame recipients